Toktar Ongarbayuly Aubakirov ( (Toqtar Oñğarbaiūly Äubäkırov), born on 27 July 1946) is a retired Kazakh Air Force officer and a former cosmonaut. He is the first person from Kazakhstan to go to space.

Early life
Toktar Aubakirov was born in Karkaraly district, Karaganda region, Kazakh SSR, which is now Kazakhstan. After graduating from the 8th grade of a secondary school he started working as a metal turner at the Temirtau foundry, whilst attending an evening school. In 1965 he joined the Armavir Military Aviation Institute of the Anti-Air Defence Pilots. He served as a fighter pilot in the Soviet Air Force on the Far East borders of the USSR until his acceptance into the Fedotov Test Pilot School in 1975.

Test pilot career
Between 1976 and 1991 Aubakirov served as a test pilot at the Mikoyan Experimental Design Bureau (MiG aircraft). During this time he tested over 50 types of aircraft. He was the first in the Soviet Union to make a nonstop flight crossing the North Pole, with two in-flight refuelings, and the first in the Soviet Union to take off from the aircraft-carrier Tbilisi (later named Kuznetsov) on a MiG 29K.

Spaceflight experience
In 1991, in accordance with an agreement between the governments of the USSR and the Kazakh SSR, started training at the Gagarin Cosmonaut Training Center. On 2 October 1991 he launched with Russian cosmonaut Alexander Volkov as flight commander, and the Austrian research cosmonaut Franz Viehböck in Soyuz TM-13 from the Baikonur Cosmodrome spaceport, and spent over eight days in space. Their mission was the last launched by the Soviet Union, which dissolved shortly thereafter, with Aubakirov becoming a citizen of the independent Republic of Kazakhstan.

Career
Since 1993, he has been the general director of the National Aerospace Agency of Republic of Kazakhstan. He was a member of the Kazakhstan parliament. Now he is a pensioner and consultant.

Family
Toktar Aubakirov is married to Tatyana Aubakirova. They have two children: Timur (born in 1977) and Mikhail (born in 1982).

Awards and honors

 Hero of Soviet Union (1988) – Test flights of MiG aircraft
 People's Hero of Kazakhstan (Halyk Kaharmany) (1995)
 Order of Otan (Kazakhstan) (1995)
 Order of Lenin (1988)
 Honoured Test Pilot of the USSR (1990)
 Pilot-Cosmonaut of the USSR (1991, last recipient)
 Pilot-Cosmonaut of Kazakhstan (1994, first recipient)
 Order of the Badge of Honour (1987)
 Decoration of Honour in Gold for Services to the Republic of Austria (Goldenes Ehrenzeichen), twice (1988 and 1993)
 Order of the October Revolution (1991)
 Medal "For Merit in Space Exploration" (12 April 2011) – for outstanding contribution to the development of international cooperation in manned space flight

See also
 List of astronauts by name

References

External links
Aubakirov at Spacefacts
Flying-Research Institute

1946 births
Living people
People from Karaganda
Soviet cosmonauts
Soviet Air Force officers
Heroes of the Soviet Union
Recipients of the Order of Lenin
Heroes of Kazakhstan
Recipients of the Decoration of Honour for Services to the Republic of Austria
Recipients of the Medal "For Merit in Space Exploration"
Soviet test pilots
Fedotov TPS alumni
Kazakhstani cosmonauts
Mir crew members